Confédération Mondiale des Activités Subaquatiques (CMAS) is an international federation that represents underwater activities in underwater sport and underwater sciences, and oversees an international system of recreational snorkel and scuba diver training and recognition.  It is also known by its English name, the World Underwater Federation, and its Spanish name, Confederación Mundial De Actividades Subacuáticas. Its foundation in Monaco during January 1959 makes it one of the world's oldest underwater diving organisations.

Origins 
An international congress of diving federations representing all underwater disciplines met in Brussels on 28 September 1958. National delegates attended from following countries: Belgium, Brazil, France, the Federal Republic of Germany, Greece, Italy, Monaco, Portugal, Switzerland, the United States of America and the former Yugoslavia. Following a decision at that congress, a meeting was held in Monaco on 9–11 January 1959, which officially established the World Underwater Federation, with an acronym based on its French title as CMAS.

A founding member and key proponent of CMAS was the French underwater explorer and diving pioneer Jacques-Yves Cousteau who was chosen to be the inaugural president with Luigi Ferraro, Italian underwater pioneer, appointed as vice-president.

CMAS succeeded the Comité des Sports Sous-Marins (Underwater Sports Committee) of the Confédération Internationale de la Pêche Sportive (CIPS) (International Confederation of Sport Fishing), which was founded on 22 February 1952.

Organisation 
CMAS consists of three major committees - sport, technical and scientific.  These committees are overseen by a board of directors (BoD) elected periodically at the annually convened general assembly. The BoD, the sport committee and the scientific committee oversee sub-committees known as commissions. Day-to-day operation is overseen by a steering committee appointed from the BoD. Its headquarters is currently located in Rome.

The steering committee 
The steering committee consists of eight members. As of 2020, the members were:

President - Anna Arzhanova (Russia)
Secretary general - Kevin O'Shaughnessy (Ireland)
Vice president - Jean-Louis Blanchard (France)
Vice president - Claudio Nolli (Italy)
President sports committee - Ilias Xiarchos  (Greece)
President technical committee - Flemming Holmn  (Denmark)
President scientific committee - Ralph Schill (Germany)
Treasurer - Alain Germain (France)

Sport committee 
The sports committee consists of commissions representing the following underwater sports - apnoea, aquathlon, finswimming, spearfishing, sport diving, underwater hockey, underwater orienteering,  underwater rugby and underwater target shooting.   An additional commission known as "visual" represents the sports of underwater photography and underwater video.  All of those sports are governed at the international level uniquely by CMAS with exception of apnoea in which competition and governance is also provided by a rival organisation, AIDA International.

Competitions
CMAS organises various global and regional competitions for the sports that it governs. Such competitions include but are not limited to:

Finswimming World Championships
Underwater Hockey World Championships
Underwater Orienteering World Championships
Underwater Photography World Championships
Underwater Rugby World Championships

In 2007, CMAS launched the CMAS Games with the first edition taking place in Bari, Italy. The event aimed to grow the popularity of underwater sports by bringing all the world championships under one event. However the event was unpopular, as many of the sports had to adjust their calendars in order to synchronise the various competitions. The CMAS Games were scrapped after their first edition and the various sports returned to having their own individual championships.

Technical committee

Role
The role of the technical committee is the provision of "safe diving for CMAS members" and seeks to achieve this by "promoting world class standards for all aspects of Scuba Diving and ensuring adherence of them by member federations and dive providers".  Its officers who are elected from persons nominated at the CMAS General Assembly by affiliated national diving federations include the following positions - president, secretary, standards director, education director, technical director, diving security director, special tasks director and a number of general members.  It oversees the two following systems - a diver training standards system known as the "CMAS International Diver Training Standards" and a certification system known as "CMAS International Diver Certificates".

Since CMAS effectively started as a volunteer organisation for hobbyists, its courses tend to reflect the full range of European and world diving standards. Compared to other diving organisations which may be more geared towards holiday and tropical water diving. While organisations like PADI or SSI tend to bring divers into the water immediately, CMAS entry-level training is more extensive, featuring more "classroom" delivered theory.

Qualifications

Standards, certification and training delivery

The CMAS Technical Committee has developed a qualification system currently known as the "CMAS International Diver Training Standards" which consists of published universal standards for recreational diving, technical diving and leadership diver grades.

The CMAS Technical Committee has also developed a diving certification system called the "CMAS International Diver Training Certification System" for most of its diver training standards and which permits divers that have been trained in accordance with the CMAS International Diver Training Standards, to have their training recognised worldwide particularly in countries where CMAS affiliated federations exist. The system includes a double sided certification card format where one side depicts the achieved CMAS standard while the other side has details of the issuing organisation and the diver.

CMAS itself does not provide training or conduct the issuing of certifications - this is available from two sources.  Firstly, from national diving federations affiliated to the CMAS Technical Committee using their member diving clubs, their member instructors where the federation is exclusively an instructor organisation or by agreement with independent underwater diving training organizations operating in the countries where those federations are based.  Secondly, from specially accredited dive centres known as "CMAS Dive Centers" (CDC) who use dedicated CMAS training materials.

Recreational diver training programmes 

Standards are offered for recreational diver training for the following grades of scuba and snorkel divers.

 Introductory SCUBA Experience - "this training programme aims at providing interested persons with an introductory diving experience, to a maximum depth of ten (10) metres under the direct supervision of a CMAS Instructor, whilst using air as a breathing gas, in a safe manner." 
 One Star Diver - "a diver who is competent in the safe and correct use of all appropriate open water scuba diving equipment in a sheltered water training area and is ready to gain open water diving experience in the company of an experienced diver."
 Two Star Diver - "a diver who has gained some open water diving experience and is considered ready to take part in dives partnered by a diver of at least the same or a higher grade. The two-star diver may dive with a One Star Diver in sheltered shallow water."
 Three Star Diver - "a fully trained, experienced, senior diver who is considered competent to supervise other divers of any grade in open water and support an instructor in the pool and open water training."
 Four Star Diver - "a three-star diver who has attained a higher than average level of knowledge and ability supported by broad diving experience. They are able to assist in the training of One Star Divers and be competent to lead divers in order to accomplish major diving tasks or project objectives."

Snorkelling
 
 One Star Snorkel Diver - "a snorkel diver who is competent in the safe and correct use of relevant snorkel diving equipment used in a swimming pool or sheltered water. The snorkel diver is familiar with relevant personal equipment and its use in a sheltered open water area. The snorkel diver is ready to gain further open water training."
 Two Star Snorkel Diver - "a snorkel diver who has gained some open water diving experience.  The snorkel diver is considered ready to take part in dives with other snorkel divers, under supervision if a minor.  The CMAS 2 star snorkel diver is considered trained."
 Three Star Snorkel Diver - "A fully trained snorkel diver who has gained considerable experience in open water snorkel diving under various conditions. The three-star snorkel diver has acquired life-saving skills and can lead snorkel divers in open water dives."

Speciality diver training programmes 
Standards are provided for the following speciality training for recreational divers:

 Apnoea Diver Level I
 Apnoea Diver Level II
 Apnoea Diver Level III
 Disabled Diver: Open Water Diving Environment Level I
 Disabled Diver: Open Water Diving Environment Level II
 Disabled Diver: Open Water Diving Environment Level III
 Enriched Air Nitrox Diver
 Drysuit Diver
 Altitude Diver
 Underwater Navigation
 Search and Recovery Diver
 Ice Diver
 Compressor Operator
 Nitrox Gas Blender
 Trimix Gas Blender
 Cave Diver Level I (Cavern Diver)
 Recreational Scooter Diver
 CPR & BLS
 Oxygen Administration
 Rescue Diver
 Recreational Trimix Diver
 Semi-Closed Rebreather Diver
 Advanced Semi-Closed Rebreather Diver
 Closed Circuit Rebreather Diver
 Children Diving Bronze Award
 Children Diving Gold Award
 Children Diving Silver Award
 Wreck Diver Level 1
 Wreck Diver Level 2

Technical diver training programmes
Standards are provided for the following technical diver training grades:

 Advanced Nitrox Diver
 Advanced Semi-Closed Rebreather Diver
 Cave Diver Level II (Apprentice Cave Diver)
 Cave Diver Level III (Full Cave Diver)
 Extended Range Nitrox Diver
 Normoxic Trimix Diver
 Overhead environment Scooter
 Technical Scooter Diver
 Trimix Diver
 Advanced Trimix Diver

Leadership diver training programmes 
Standards are provided for the training of the following grades of recreational snorkel and scuba instructors:

 One Star Snorkel Diver Instructor - "a CMAS 2 star snorkel diver who is interested in and has knowledge of practical snorkel diver instruction.  The instructor is qualified to conduct practical lessons in a swimming pool and to teach the CMAS 1 star snorkel diver certificate.  The instructor can be used as an assistant instructor in open water, but cannot plan an open water dive and lead a group of divers on his own."
 Two Star Snorkel Diver Instructor - "an experienced one-star snorkel diver instructor who has the knowledge, skills, and experience required to lead and instruct 1, 2 and 3 Star snorkel diver students in the classroom, swimming pool, and open water.  The experienced CMAS 2 Star snorkel diver instructor may assist in the training and education of CMAS 1 Star snorkel diver instructors."
 One Star Instructor - "a three- or four-star diver who has demonstrated a knowledge of the techniques of diving instruction and has proven, under evaluation, to be competent in practical instructional skills and diving safety procedures: They are qualified to train and certify novice diving students in a full CMAS One-Star Diver scuba program."
 Two Star Instructor - "an experienced one-star instructor who has the knowledge, skills, and experience required to teach groups of divers in the classroom, pool, and in open water, and to train qualified dive supervisors, assistant instructors and assist in the training & evaluation of One-Star Instructors. They are qualified to teach and certify all CMAS diver levels including snorkel instructor levels."
 Three Star Instructor - "a highly experienced two-star instructor who is competent to train all grades of divers and instructors and able to take responsibility for instructor certification programs and the conduct of diving schools/centres and specialised training courses or events."

Instructor speciality grades
Standards are provided for speciality training of assistants, dive supervisors, snorkel instructors and scuba instructors:

 Apnoea Instructor
 Instructors Assistant for Disabled Divers
 Instructor for Disabled Divers
 Instructor Trainer for Disabled Divers
 Nitrox Instructor
 Advanced Nitrox Instructor
 Nitrox Instructor Three Star
 Ice Diver Instructor
 Trimix Instructor
 Advanced Trimix Instructor
 Nitrox Gas Blender Instructor
 Trimix Gas Blender Instructor
 Cave Diving Instructor I (Cavern Diving Instructor)
 Cave Diving Instructor II (Full Cave Diving Instructor)
 Cave Diving Instructor III (Cave Diving Staff Instructor)
 Recreational Scooter Assistant
 Technical Scooter Assistant
 Overhead Environment Scooter Assistant
 Recreational Scooter Instructor
 Technical Scooter Instructor
 Overhead Environment Scooter Instructor
 Semi-Closed Rebreather Instructor
 Advanced Semi-Closed Rebreather
 Closed Circuit Rebreather Instructor
 Children Diving Dive Leader
 Children Diving Instructor
 Children Diving Instructor Trainer

Scientific committee

Role
The committee considers its main task is to bring to the attention of the world underwater diving community, the important issues concerning the marine environment and how divers can play a major role in protecting it by serving as frontline observers of its overall health, particularly in respect to invasive species, coastal ecosystems and biodiversity.
Its officers who are elected from persons nominated at the CMAS General Assembly by affiliated national diving federations include the following positions - president, secretary, a number of general members and presidents of the following commissions - marine biology, marine archaeology, geology and professional relationships.

Scientific diving codes
Over a 10-year period from 1977, it was responsible for the development of the "Code of Practice for Scientific Diving" for UNESCO  in cooperation with Sea Grant.

Qualifications
The CMAS Scientific Committee oversees a system of diving standards and certification that operates in parallel to the CMAS International Diver Training Certification System.
The system was developed to which recognize the status of a diver who is qualified to dive in the course of research whilst employed.  This internationally recognized standard of competence is a distinct advantage for working scientists who wish to travel between laboratories and institutes in different countries.
Known as the CMAS Scientific Diver Standard, the system consists of the following diver and instructor grades:
 CMAS Scientific Diver (CSD) (pre-requisite of CMAS 2 Star Diver plus scientific diver training)
 CMAS Advanced Scientific Diver (CASD) (pre-requisite of CMAS 3 Star Diver plus advanced scientific diver training)
 CMAS Scientific Diving Instructor (pre-requisite: CMAS 2 Star Instructor)
 CMAS Confirmed Scientific Diving Instructor (pre-requisite: CMAS 3 Star Instructor)
A programme of specialist courses both at entry and advanced levels in underwater archaeology, freshwater biology, marine biology, marine geology and oceanology is also offered.
Training and certification (also known as brevets) for the above qualifications is available from organisations known as CMAS Scientific Centres (CSC).

Recognitions, agreements and affiliations

Recognitions 
Organisations which recognise CMAS as the international federation for underwater sport and activities include:

 International Olympic Committee (IOC)
 UNESCO
 SportAccord (formerly General Association of International Sports Federations (GAISF))
 World Games
 World Anti-Doping Agency (WADA)

Agreements 
 Agreement with the International Life Saving Federation (ILSF) was signed on 21 October 1994 regarding recognition of ILSF's rescue diver and instructors. 
 Agreement with the Professional Association of Diving Instructors (PADI) was signed on 30 January 1998 in Anaheim regarding a system of recognition for scuba divers moving between the CMAS and PADI training schemes.
 Agreement with the Nautical Archaeology Society (NAS) was signed on 27 April 2002 in Brussels to ‘explore the possibilities of cooperation between NAS and CMAS in the field of underwater archaeology’ including "exchange of information" and mutual recognition of training programs.

Affiliations 
 International Union for Conservation of Nature (IUCN)

Member federations 
CMAS membership consists of at least 130 national federations from five continents:

See also

General

Key people

International organisations

Organisations

Sport

References

External links 
CMAS homepage
History of CMAS website
CMAS American Zone (in Spanish, English and Portuguese)
Asian Underwater Federation (CMAS Asia)
CMAS Europe homepage

Underwater sports
Sports governing bodies by sport
Underwater sports organizations
Finswimming
Freediving
 
Underwater orienteering
Underwater photography (sport)
Underwater rugby
Underwater diving training organizations
Sports organizations established in 1959
1950s establishments in Monaco
Diver organizations